The 1961 Football Cup of Ukrainian SSR among KFK  was the annual season of Ukraine's football knockout competition for amateur football teams.

Competition schedule

Preliminary round

|}
Notes:

First qualification round

|}
Notes:

Second qualification round

|}
Notes:

Quarterfinals (1/4)

|}

Semifinals (1/2)

|}

Final

|}

External links
 1961. regional-football.ru

Ukrainian Amateur Cup
Ukrainian Amateur Cup
Amateur Cup